Abdulaziz Al-Jebreen (Arabic: عبدالعزيز الجبرين; born 19 April 1990 in Riyadh) is a Saudi Arabian professional footballer who currently plays as a midfielder for Al-Raed.

Career
Al-Jebreen started his career at the youth teams of Al-Shabab before moving to Al-Raed in 2010. On 2 August 2012, Al-Jebreen made his league debut for Al-Raed in the 2–2 draw against Al-Ittihad. On 16 July 2013, Al-Jebreen signed his first professional contract with Al-Raed. On 7 May 2014, Al-Jebreen joined Al-Nassr on a five-year contract for a reported fee of SAR12 million. On 10 April 2018, Al-Jebreen renewed his contract with Al-Nassr. On 21 October 2020, Al-Jebreen joined Al-Ittihad on a free transfer. On 24 July 2022, Al-Jebreen was released by Al-Ittihad after both sides agreed to end it mutually. On the same day, Al-Jebreen joined Al-Batin on a one-year deal. After Al-Batin failed to register him in their squad, Al-Jebreen and the club agreed to end their contract. On 31 August 2022, Al-Jebreen joined former club Al-Raed.

Honours
Al-Nassr
 Saudi Professional League: 2014–15, 2018–19
 Saudi Super Cup: 2019

References

1990 births
Living people
Saudi Arabian footballers
Saudi Arabia international footballers
Al-Shabab FC (Riyadh) players
Al-Raed FC players
Al Nassr FC players
Ittihad FC players
Al Batin FC players
Sportspeople from Riyadh
Saudi Professional League players
Association football midfielders